The 2021–22 Grand Canyon Antelopes women's basketball team represents Grand Canyon University in Phoenix, Arizona, during the 2021–22 NCAA Division I women's basketball season.  The Antelopes, led by second year head coach Molly Miller, play their home games at the GCU Arena as members of the Western Athletic Conference.

Roster

Schedule and Results

|-
!colspan=12 style=| Exhibition

|-
!colspan=12 style=| Non-conference regular season

|-
!colspan=12 style=| WAC conference season

|-
!colspan=9 style=|WAC Tournament

|-
!colspan=9 style=|WNIT

See also 
2021–22 Grand Canyon Antelopes men's basketball team

References 

Grand Canyon Antelopes women's basketball seasons
Grand Canyon
Grand Canyon
Grand Canyon
Grand Canyon